Sara Paretsky (born June 8, 1947) is an American author of detective fiction, best known for her novels focused on the protagonist V. I. Warshawski.

Life and career
Paretsky was born in Ames, Iowa. Her father was a microbiologist and moved the family to Kansas in 1951 after taking a job at the University of Kansas, where Paretsky eventually graduated. The family rented an old farm house. Her relationship with her parents was strained; her mother was an alcoholic and her father was a harsh disciplinarian.

After obtaining a bachelor's degree in political science from the University of Kansas, she did community service work on the south side of Chicago in 1966 and returned in 1968 to work there. She completed her AM (masters) degree at the University of Chicago in 1969 and completed a Ph.D. in history there in 1977; her dissertation was titled "The Breakdown of Moral Philosophy in New England Before the Civil War". She also earned an MBA in 1977 from the University of Chicago Graduate School of Business.

Her husband, Courtenay Wright, was a professor of physics at the University of Chicago; the two were together from 1970 until his death in 2018.

Paretsky is an alumna of the Ragdale Foundation. She was to appear in an amateur light opera production in 2011.

The protagonist of all but two of Paretsky's novels is the female private investigator V.I. Warshawski, and the author is credited with transforming the role and image of women in the crime novel.  The Winter 2007 issue of Clues: A Journal of Detection is devoted to her work. She is also considered the founding mother of Sisters in Crime, an organization that supports and promotes women in the mystery field.

Bibliography

Novels
Indemnity Only (1982) 
Deadlock (1984) 
Killing Orders (1985) 
Bitter Medicine (1987) 
Blood Shot (1988) (Published in the UK as Toxic Shock) 
Burn Marks (1990) 
Guardian Angel (1992) 
Tunnel Vision (1994) 
Ghost Country (1998)  (non-Warshawski novel)
Hard Time (1999) 
Total Recall (2001) 
Blacklist (2003) 
Fire Sale (2005) 
Bleeding Kansas (2008)  (non-Warshawski novel)
Hardball (2009) 
Body Work (2010) 
Breakdown (2012) 
Critical Mass (2013) 
Brush Back (2015) 
Fallout (2017) 
Shell Game (2018)  
Dead Land (2020) 
Overboard (2022)

Short story collections
 Windy City Blues, Delacorte (1995)  (1988) (Published in the UK as V.I. for Short) 
 A Taste of Life and Other Stories, London, Penguin, (1995). 
Love & Other Crimes (2020). ISBN 978-0062915542

eBooks
 Photo Finish (2000) 
 V.I. x 2 (2002) includes short stories 'Photo Finish' & 'Publicity Stunts'
 V.I. x 3 (2011) includes both stories from V.I. x 2 and 'A Family Sunday in the Park'

Non-fiction
Case Studies in Alternative Education. Chicago Center for New Schools, 1975 .
Writing in an Age of Silence (2007) 
Words, Works, and Ways of Knowing: The Breakdown of Moral Philosophy in New England Before the Civil War. Chicago: University of Chicago Press, 2016.

As editor
Eye of a Woman (short stories). New York, Delacorte Press, 1990 ; as A Woman's Eye: New Stories by the Best Women Crime Writers, London, Virago, 1991
Women on the Case (1997) ; as Woman's Other Eye, London, Virago, 1996
Sisters on the Case (2007)

Awards and recognition
 1986 Anthony award nomination for best novel, Killing Orders
 1989 Anthony award nomination for best novel, Blood Shot
 1992 Anthony award winner of best short story collection award, A Woman's Eye
 2002 Cartier Diamond Dagger Award for lifetime achievement by the Crime Writers' Association.
 2004 Gold Dagger Award for Blacklist by the Crime Writers' Association.
 2011 Anthony award Lifetime Achievement award winner
 2011 Grand Master by the Mystery Writers of America
 2019 Mystery Writers of America Winner of Sue Grafton Memoriam, Shell Game
 2021 Mystery Writers of America Nomination for Sue Grafton Memoriam, Dead Land

References

External links
 
 Roger Nichols of Modern Signed Books interviews Sara Paretsky
Interview with Sara Paretsky, Speaking of Mysteries TV Series (2001)
Sara Paretsky papers at The Newberry

1947 births
20th-century American novelists
21st-century American novelists
American mystery writers
American detective fiction writers
American women novelists
Cartier Diamond Dagger winners
Living people
People from Ames, Iowa
American people of Polish-Jewish descent
University of Chicago alumni 
University of Chicago Booth School of Business alumni
University of Kansas alumni
Writers from Chicago
Jewish American novelists
Anthony Award winners
Edgar Award winners
Women mystery writers
Novelists from Iowa
20th-century American women writers
21st-century American women writers
Novelists from Illinois
21st-century American Jews